Ashley James Stichbury (5 August 1971 – 17 May 2002), was a New Zealand motor racing driver.

Career 
Born in Hastings in 1971 to Paul and Susan-Jane, Stichbury began his motor racing career at the age of 14 through karting. After winning multiple titles throughout New Zealand and Australia, Stichbury began his foray into cars, competing in the New Zealand Formula Ford Championship. Stichbury would finish second overall in his debut season and drew the attention of Austrian Walter Lechner, who would offer Stichbury a car for the World Formula Ford Festival and the next season of the New Zealand Formula Ford Championship in lieu of helping Alexander Wurz in the German Formula Ford Championship.

Following a successful campaign in Europe, Stichbury returned to New Zealand and would win the New Zealand Formula Ford Championship in both 1993 and 1994. To this day, Stichbury remains the only driver to win the New Zealand Formula Ford title on two consecutive occasions.

After a deal to return to Europe did not come to fruition, Stichbury turned his attention to touring cars and the national Trans-Am series (branded in New Zealand as 'TraNZam'). Stichbury maintained a dominant reign whenever he was racing and captured the 2000-01 TraNZam title after winning nine of the 13 race. Following these strong performances, Stichbury was drafted into the Paul Morris Motorsport outfit for the 2001 V8 Supercar 1000 to partner Paul Morris, replacing original co-driver Matt Neal.

Later in 2001, the first season of the New Zealand V8 Touring Car Championship was run, and Stichbury dominated the season. After winning 12 out of the 18 races held and setting the fastest lap in every race, Stichbury became the first championship of the series. It would also turn out to be his final championship victory.

Former teammate and Formula One driver Alexander Wurz regarded Stichbury as one of the two best drivers he had driven against - the other driver being three-time Formula One champion Ayrton Senna.

Illness and death 
Stichbury suffered a cerebral haemorrhage, after which he was placed on life support. He would pass away following a scan and operation at Auckland City Hospital in 2002. He was survived by his wife, Anna, and son, Zak.  His son has since achieved success in karting.<ref>Motorsport: Dad's old engines do job for Zac Stichbury, Shane Hurndell, Hawkes Bay Today, 11 Mar 2019 04:16 PM, retrieved 2 May 2022

Racing record

Career summary

Complete Bathurst 1000 results

References

External links
 

New Zealand racing drivers
Formula Ford drivers
1971 births
2002 deaths